Robert James Bidinotto (born 1949) is a novelist, journalist, editor, and lecturer. He is best known for his critiques of leniency within the criminal justice system, and for criticisms of the environmentalist movement and philosophy. Bidinotto is influenced by the philosophy and writings of Ayn Rand, and from July 2005 until October 2008 he was editor-in-chief of The New Individualist, the monthly magazine published by The Atlas Society. In 2011, he turned his focus to writing crime fiction.

Background
In the mid-1980s, Bidinotto was a contributing editor for the Objectivist political newsletter On Principle; then, in 1987, for its brief-lived successor, Oasis magazine. Also during the mid-1980s, he self-published several papers and lectures on libertarianism, styles of thinking, and problems of practicing the philosophy of individualism within the context of ideological organizations.

During the late 1980s and until 1995, Bidinotto was a staff writer for Reader's Digest, for which he authored high-profile pieces dealing with failings in the United States criminal justice system. The most well-known of these was "Getting Away with Murder" (July 1988), which, during the 1988 presidential campaign, helped make murderer William R. ("Willie") Horton and prison furloughs among the decisive issues in the defeat of candidate Michael Dukakis. He also wrote in the magazine about environmental issues, such as the Alar scare and global warming.

Subsequently, he worked for several years for The Objectivist Center in a number of writing, speaking, and fundraising capacities, and later for The Capital Research Center in Washington, D.C., where he edited two monthly periodicals: Organization Trends and Foundation Watch. He left CRC in July 2005 to return to The Objectivist Center, now called The Atlas Society, where he served as editor-in-chief of their monthly magazine of politics and culture, The New Individualist, until October 2008.

Bidinotto's work as a writer and editor has won a number of awards. In September 2007, The New Individualist was honored with Folio magazine's prestigious Gold "Eddie" Award for Bidinotto's article "Up from Conservatism," which appeared in the magazine's March 2007 issue. The American Society of Magazine Editors recognized Bidinotto's prison-furlough article in the July 1988 Reader's Digest as one of five national finalists for "Best Magazine Article of the Year in the Public Interest Category."

Bidinotto currently resides with his wife on the Chesapeake Bay, where he is working on sequels in his "Dylan Hunter" vigilante thriller series.

Selected bibliography
  
 "Terrorism and Unilateral Moral Disarmament" in 
 "Prison Furloughs Allow Criminals to Commit More Crimes" in 
 "What Is Freedom For?" in 
 "What Is the Truth about Global Warming?" in 
 "Global Warming" in 
 "Environmentalism: Freedom's Foe for the '90's" in 
 Editor.

References

External links
 The Vigilante Author blog
 

1949 births
21st-century American novelists
American magazine journalists
American mystery novelists
American male novelists
American male journalists
American political writers
Living people
Objectivists
21st-century American non-fiction writers
21st-century American male writers